The Men's 50 metre breaststroke SB3 event at the 2020 Paralympic Games took place on 25 August 2021, at the Tokyo Aquatics Centre.

Heats

The swimmers with the top 8 times, regardless of heat, advanced to the final.

Final

References

Swimming at the 2020 Summer Paralympics